Patrick Maguire may refer to:
Patrick Maguire (politician) (died 1970), Irish Fianna Fáil politician
Patrick Maguire (bishop) (died 1826), Irish Roman Catholic prelate
Patrick Leo Maguire (1903–1985), Irish singer-songwriter and radio presenter
Patrick Maguire House, on National Register of Historic Places listings in Maury County, Tennessee
Pat Maguire (boxer) in 1966 British Empire and Commonwealth Games

See also
Paddy Maguire (disambiguation)
Pat McGuire (disambiguation)
Patrick McGuire (disambiguation)